Rick Plum (born 12 June 1973) is a Dutch former footballer who played as a defender, and currently working as a talent coach at Roda JC Kerkrade.

Managerial career
Plum was interim manager for Roda JC in the latter stage of the 2014-2015 season in the Eerste Divisie and managed them into promotion to the Eredivisie, but stepped back after the season due to burning out and returned to his post as assistant manager. He again was interim manager for Roda JC in the Eredivisie on 25 May 2017, until the end of the season.

In 2018, Plum was diagnosed with Parkinson's disease and therefore decided in July to resign from his position in Roda. In the summer 2021, Plum returned to Roda as a talent coach.

References

External links
Roda JC Profile
ZeroZero Profile

1973 births
Living people
Sportspeople from Kerkrade
Dutch footballers
Dutch football managers
Association football defenders
Roda JC Kerkrade players
MVV Maastricht players
FC Den Bosch players
Eredivisie players
Eerste Divisie players
Roda JC Kerkrade managers
Eerste Divisie managers
Eredivisie managers
Footballers from Limburg (Netherlands)
Roda JC Kerkrade non-playing staff